Martin Roll (born 2 March 1967) is a Danish author, brand strategist and management consultant. Roll appears regularly in global television and print media. He holds an MBA from INSEAD where he is a Distinguished Fellow and an Entrepreneur in Residence. Roll's first book, Asian Brand Strategy, was named one of the "Best Business Books: Marketing" in 2006 by Strategy+Business magazine. He is the founder CEO of Martin Roll Company, an advisory firm based in Singapore. He advises Fortune 500 companies, Asian firms, family-owned businesses and also served as a senior advisor to McKinsey & Company.

Early life and education 
Martin Roll received a bachelor's degree in business and marketing management from Copenhagen Business School in 1989. He attended Young Managers Program in 1998 and completed his MBA from INSEAD in 1999.

Career 
After completing his bachelor's degree in 1989, he worked in marketing and advertising firms including Bates and DDB Worldwide, handling global accounts like Ericsson and McDonald's.

In 2000, he took on the role as chief marketing officer (CMO) with a Danish tech company, whose regional headquarters was in Singapore. Martin Roll founded his own management consulting business in 2002 aimed at helping companies to build their global brands. He advises Fortune 500 companies, Asian firms and family-owned businesses on strategy, leadership, branding and marketing.

Roll was appointed as Senior Adviser to the global public relations firm, Burson-Marsteller in December 2011.

In October 2017, he was appointed as Senior Advisor at Singapore based venture capital firm, Cocoon Capital. He is an Associate fellow with the Institute on Asian Consumer Insight (ACI). Martin Roll was appointed Senior Advisor to freelance-based agency Superson in March 2019.

Roll has served as Senior Advisor at McKinsey & Company.

Publications 
In 2005, Martin authored his first book Asian Brand Strategy: How Asia Builds Strong Brands, published by Palgrave Macmillan. Asian Brand Strategy is regarded as one of the best books written on Asian branding strategy and was rated a top global marketing book of 2006 by Strategy+Business.

Professor John Quelch at Harvard Business School called it, "An important handbook for Asian executives aspiring to build strong brands. It provides a solid foundation for future success in the global marketplace."

The Daily Telegraph in its book review wrote, "In Asian Brand Strategy, he [Martin] sets out 10 ways to create an Asian brand in a marketplace that in the past has often dismissed image as unimportant."

In a review of the book, Dominic Barton from McKinsey & Company said, "Martin Roll provides a compelling and practical roadmap on how to do this based on his extensive experience advising Asian corporations."

Martin Roll co-authored the book, The Future of Branding in 2016 together with a team of global business and marketing academics including Kevin Lane Keller, Don E. Schultz and Rajendra K. Srivastava.

Martin Roll is a business columnist with Harvard Business Review and INSEAD Knowledge.

Public speaking 
Martin Roll is a frequent keynote speaker and EMCEE at international conferences on business and brand strategy with a focus on Asian brands, global strategy and leadership. He has spoken at business events like Thinkers50, Women's Forum for the Economy and Society, Arab Luxury World, TEDx, World Knowledge Forum, The Harvard Project for Asian and International Relations (HPAIR), Strategy Summit and Global Leaders Summit, PowerBrands Glam Las Vegas.

Academic 
Roll teaches MBA, EMBA and Executive Education programmes at Nanyang Business School. He also lectures at INSEAD, CEIBS and ESSEC.

Bibliography

Personal life  
He is a Danish citizen and a Permanent resident of Singapore. He currently splits his time between Copenhagen and Singapore. In an interview with China Daily, Roll said he spent about 250 days a year travelling globally on client engagements and keynote speeches.

References

External links

 Biography from Martin Roll Company
 Martin Roll at TED (conference)
 An Interview with Martin Roll at Women's Forum for the Economy and Society
 Riding the Wave: Asian Brands Go Global at Asia Society

Living people
INSEAD alumni
People from Copenhagen
Business speakers
Business writers
Marketing people
Marketing theorists
Business educators
Danish marketing people
McKinsey & Company people
21st-century Danish businesspeople
1967 births